Derrell Olpherts (born 7 January 1992) is an English professional rugby league footballer who most recently played as a er,  or  for the Leeds Rhinos in the Super League.

He has previously played for the Dewsbury Rams in the Championship, the Hemel Stags and the Newcastle Thunder in League 1, and the Salford Red Devils in the Super League.

Background
Olpherts was born in Wakefield, West Yorkshire, England.

Career

Dewsbury Rams 
Olpherts made his professional début on 19 February 2012 for Dewsbury in a cup tie against Featherstone.

Hemel Stags 
Olpherts played for the Hemel Stags in the Kingstone Press League 1 in 2015, making 22 appearances and scoring 7 tries as a fullback.

Newcastle Thunder 
Olpherts represented the Newcastle Thunder in League 1 between 2016 and 2017. He was utilised as a centre or fullback and scored 30 tries in 41 appearances.

Salford Red Devils 
Olpherts joined the Salford Red Devils for the 2018 season. He made his Super League début for Salford against Widnes.

Castleford Tigers 
In July 2019, Olpherts signed a three-year contract with Castleford Tigers to start from the 2020 season. Head coach Daryl Powell said of him: "Derrell has been a standout winger in Super League this season. His ability to break tackles and make the game quick is outstanding."

Olpherts made his Castleford début on 2 February 2020 against the Toronto Wolfpack. He scored his first try for the club on 7 February against Wigan. He finished the 2020 season as Castleford's joint-highest tryscorer alongside Greg Eden.

On 17 July 2021, Olpherts played for Castleford in their 2021 Challenge Cup Final loss against St Helens.

In round 20 of the 2022 Super League season, Olpherts scored four tries and was named Man of the Match against Hull FC, marking his first hat-trick for Castleford.

On 26 August 2022, Castleford confirmed that Olpherts would leave the club at the end of the season upon the expiry of his contract.

Leeds Rhinos
On 20 October 2022, Olpherts signed a 2-year contract with Leeds Rhinos to start from the 2023 season.

Statistics 

(* denotes season still competing)

References

External links
Castleford Tigers profile
Salford Red Devils profile
SL profile

1992 births
Living people
Castleford Tigers players
Dewsbury Rams players
Hemel Stags players
Leeds Rhinos players
Newcastle Thunder players
Rugby league centres
Rugby league fullbacks
Rugby league players from Wakefield
Rugby league wingers
Salford Red Devils players